Ibrahim Maalouf (born 5 November 1980 in Beirut) is a French-Lebanese trumpeter, producer, arranger, and composer.
In 2022, he became the first Lebanese instrumentalist nominated at the Grammy Awards for his album Queen of Sheba in collaboration with Angélique Kidjo.

Biography
His father is trumpeter Nassim Maalouf and his mother is pianist Nada Maalouf. His uncle is the writer Amin Maalouf and his grandfather was the journalist, poet, and musicologist Rushdi Maalouf.

After leaving his home country as a child during the Lebanese Civil War, he grew up in Paris with his sister Layla. He studied there until the age of 17 and earned a degree in General Science and Specialized Mathematics from the Lycée Geoffroy-Saint-Hilaire in Étampes (Essonne).

When he was seven years old, he started to learn how to play the trumpet from his father, a former student of French trumpeter Maurice André at the Conservatoire de Paris. He learned classical, baroque, modern, and contemporary repertoires, as well as classical Arabic music and improvisation. His father invented the microtonal trumpet or "quarter tone trumpet", which makes it possible to play Arabic maqams on the trumpet.

As a teenager Maalouf accompanied his father in a duo throughout Europe and the Middle East, playing a baroque repertoire by Tomaso Giovanni Albinoni, Henry Purcell, and Antonio Vivaldi. He performed a difficult classical piece, the Second Brandenburg Concerto by Johann Sebastian Bach. Maurice André advised him to give up science and pursue music instead. He took André's advice and spent five years at the Conservatoire de Paris. He recorded with Matthieu Chedid, Vincent Delerm, and Arthur H. He became a teacher at CNR d'Aubervilliers-La Courneuve and gave master classes in the U.S. His first solo album was Diasporas (2007) on his label.

He has composed several movie soundtracks and several pieces for choirs and symphonic orchestras. He has worked with  Sting, Salif Keita, Amadou & Mariam, Lhasa de Sela, Marcel Khalife, Vanessa Paradis, Juliette Gréco, and Archie Shepp. He teaches improvisation at Conservatoire à Rayonnement Régional de Paris (Paris Regional Superieur Conservatory).

Maalouf passed an open competition at the CNR de Paris (regional Conservatory) and joined the class of Gérard Boulanger for a two-year training course. After that, he passed another open competition and joined the Conservatoire de Paris in Antoine Curé's class for a three-year training course. He obtained degrees from both schools and entered national, European, and international trumpet competitions. He wrote more than 15 pieces for different ensembles from small to symphonic orchestras and choirs that were commissioned since 2005.

From 2006 to 2013, Maalouf was a trumpet instructor at the CNR of Aubervilliers, La Courneuve in France,

In 2000, Maalouf met producer Marc-Antoine Moreau, who introduced him to the cellist Vincent Segal. It was the beginning of a long and fruitful series of encounters. In November 2008, Maalouf played in the opera Welcome to the Voice at the Chatelet Theatre in Paris composed by Steve Nieve and directed by Muriel Teodori. Maalouf encountered on stage Elvis Costello, Sylvia Schwartz, and Sting, who played the lead role. Sting asked him to play on his album If on a Winter's Night...

Maalouf has composed music since he was very young. He presented his compositions for the first time in 1999. His first group Farah had an Oriental jazz flavor because he was accompanied by a saxophone, a ney (Middle-Eastern end-blown flute), a transverse flute, a piano, a double bass, a guitar, a buzuq (a long-necked fretted lute related to the Greek bouzouki) and Arabic percussion. A concert recording by this group was broadcast on several music channels between 2004 and 2005.

In 2004, his encounter with Lhasa de Sela opened the doors of electronic music to him. His collaboration with pop and rock singers made him discover other musical styles apart from jazz, classical, and Arabic music. His compositions began to reflect a more contemporary style. In 2006, he met Alejandra Norambuena Skira (from the SACEM's Action Fund), who introduced him to Jean-Louis Perrier. Perrier helped him to form the band with whom he gave a concert on February 12, 2006 at the Paris New Morning Jazz Club.

His music and his trumpet playing are inspired by his Arabic culture, but the surrounding instruments (bass, electric guitar, drums, Arabic percussion, vibraphone) and the musicians with whom he performs give a rock, electronic, and jazz funk flavor to his music.

Maalouf gets a lot of his inspiration from his culture of origin. This subject has been explored in the documentary Souffle! (Blow), directed by Christophe Trahand and produced by Cocottes Minutes between 2005 and 2006. Christophe Trahand followed Ibrahim for several months pursuing the key to his inspiration and to explore his relationship with his native country and the distance that separates him from it. This documentary was broadcast by TV5 MONDE and is available on DVD in the collection Docnet Films.

Spotted by legendary producer Quincy Jones during a concert at the Montreux Jazz Festival in 2017, Ibrahim became one of the artists that the American producer regularly promotes via the Los Angeles-based Quincy Jones Productions. That same year, Ibrahim Maalouf was invited to the musical inauguration of the Louvre Abu Dhabi Museum and also appeared on the jury of the Miss Lebanon election, live on LBC (Lebanese television).

After playing alongside Sting at the reopening of the Bataclan in Paris, he then paid tribute to Tignous, one of the Charlie Hebdo cartoonists who was brutally murdered, at his funeral. He also honored the memory of the victims of the Paris terrorist attacks of fall 2015 in a national tribute, composing a hymn sung by young French star Louane. In 2021 he was chosen to play the national anthem in front of the Eiffel Tower in Paris, on July 14, 2021, the performance was broadcast on national TV for 6 million viewers. 

In November 2022 he released his 16th studio album Capacity to Love, an urban music album, but above all a hymn to inclusion.
The album includes artists such as Erick The Architect, leader of the Brooklyn-based rap group Flatbush Zombies, Tank and the Bangas, Cimafunk, Shelea Frazier,a protégé of Quincy Jones, the young Alemeda recently signed to TDE, Kendrick Lamar's label, D Smoke, winner of " Rhythm + Flow " the Netlfix rap contest, the English singer JP Cooper, but also artists more identified in France such as the Californian crooner Gregory Porter, Pos of De La Soul; the mythical group of New York rap, the French star Matthieu Chédid, or the Franco-Brazilian Flavia Coelho. Among all these guests, Ibrahim Maalouf has also invited Sharon Stone to lay her voice on a powerful and committed track.

Awards
Between 1999 and 2003, Maalouf earned awards in fifteen competitions throughout the world. These include first prize in the Hungarian International Trumpet Competition in Pilisvörösvár in May 2002, first prize in the National Trumpet Competition (Washington D.C.) in 2001, and second prize (ex aequo) in the Maurice André International Competition in Paris in 2003. 
In July 2010, he was given the Instrumental Revelation of the Year at the French Jazz Music Awards (Victoires du Jazz). 
He won Best World Music Artist at the French Music Awards in 2014. 
In 2017, at the César Awards, he won the Best Original Score award. 
In 2022, he became the first Lebanese instrumentalist nominated at the Grammy Awards for his album Queen of Sheba in collaboration with Angélique Kidjo.

Honours

Discography

Studio albums

Live albums

Singles

Other songs

Soundtracks

Guest appearance 

 The Way Things Go - Laurent David (2011, alter-nativ)

Productions

See also
Maalouf

References

External links

 Official website

1980 births
Chevaliers of the Ordre des Arts et des Lettres
Conservatoire de Paris alumni
French film score composers
French musicians
Lebanese emigrants to France
Knights of the Ordre national du Mérite
Lebanese classical trumpeters
Lebanese jazz musicians
Lebanese musicians
Living people
Musicians from Beirut
21st-century trumpeters